Lucía Pérez Vizcaíno (born 5 July 1985 in O Incio, Lugo, Galicia ) is a Spanish singer who represented her country in the Eurovision Song Contest 2011 in Germany with the song "Que me quiten lo bailao".

Career
In 2002, at 17, Lucía Pérez won the talent show for amateur singers Canteira de Cantareiros, on the regional Galician television (TVG). A year later she published her first album, Amores y amores, which was awarded the Galician Gold Record certification for its sales.

In 2005, she received the Galician Soloist Pop Album award. Later that year, she represented Spain in the Viña del Mar International Song Festival in Chile and she placed second in the international competition with the song "Qué haría contigo". Also in 2005, her song "Amarás Miña Terra" was nominated for Best Song in Galician at the Spanish Music Awards.

In 2008, her third album, Volar por los tejados, was released both in Spain and Chile, where she toured extensively. In 2009, she took part in the Viña del Mar Festival for a second time. In 2010, she released her fourth album, Dígocho en galego which is entirely in Galician language. 
 
In 2011, Lucía took part in the Spanish selection process for the Eurovision Song Contest 2011, Destino Eurovisión, and on 18 February, she won the final with the song "Que me quiten lo bailao".

In March 2011, following her election as the Spanish Eurovision entrant, Lucía was signed to Warner Music to release her fifth album, Cruzo los dedos, in April 2011.

At the Eurovision Song Contest 2011 final that took place in Düsseldorf, Germany on 14 May she placed 23rd. However, she was 16th in the separate televoting result.

On 22 June 2014, Pérez released her sixth studio album, Quitapenas. In May 2018, Pérez released her seventh studio album Quince soles, which includes collaborations with Chenoa, Rosa Cedrón and Chema Purón.

Discography

Albums

Singles

References

External links 

1985 births
Eurovision Song Contest entrants of 2011
Living people
Singers from Galicia (Spain)
Eurovision Song Contest entrants for Spain
Galician-language singers
21st-century Spanish singers
21st-century Spanish women singers